Carsten Rump (born 31 March 1981) is a German former professional footballer and manager. In his active career, he played as a defender for Arminia Bielefeld and VfB Lübeck.

References

External links

1981 births
Living people
People from Dessau-Roßlau
German footballers
Association football defenders
Arminia Bielefeld players
VfB Lübeck players
2. Bundesliga players
Arminia Bielefeld managers
2. Bundesliga managers
Footballers from Saxony-Anhalt
German football managers